Limestone bedstraw is a common name for several plants and may refer to:

 Galium proliferum, native to the southwestern United States and northern Mexico
 Galium sterneri, native to northern Europe